Lost Creek is a stream in Dent County in the U.S. state of Missouri. It is a tributary of the Meramec River.

Lost Creek was named for the fact it is a losing stream along part of its course.

See also
List of rivers of Missouri

References

Rivers of Dent County, Missouri
Rivers of Missouri
Tributaries of the Meramec River